Witold Leszczyński (16 August 1933 – 1 September 2007) was a Polish film director and screenwriter.  In 1967 he graduated from the National Film School in Łódź. He directed over thirty films between 1959 and 2007. Most known for Żywot Mateusza (Matthew's Days) based on a novel by Norwegian writer Tarjei Vesaas, Konopielka, adapted from the novel of Edward Redliński , Siekierezada based on a novel by Edward Stachura and many others films.

He received numerous awards, including Grand Prix at the Polish Film Festival in 1986.

The director died during the shoot of his film Stary człowiek i pies (The Old Man and the Dog) in 2007.

Filmography
 Requiem (2001)
 Koloss (1993)
 Siekierezada (1986)
 Konopielka (1982)
 Przemysłowy Instytut Elektroniki '78 (1978)
 Rekolekcje (1978)
 Rewizja osobista (1973)
 Qu'est-ce qui fait courir Jacky? (1969)
 Żywot Mateusza (1968)
 Zabawa (1961)
 Skowronek (1960)
 Portret mężczyzny z medalionem (1959)

References

External links

Witold Leszczyński at the Culture.pl 

1933 births
2007 deaths
Polish film directors
Film people from Łódź
20th-century Polish screenwriters
Male screenwriters
20th-century Polish male writers